The Asian Junior and Cadet Table Tennis Championships is an annual table tennis tournament regarded as continental championships between juniors and cadets. The Asian Junior and Cadet Table Tennis Championships (AJCTTC) is one of the most prestigious events of the world junior table tennis circuit. It will be held under the supervision of the Asian Table Tennis Union (ATTU) and International Table Tennis Federation (ITTF). Cadet Championships was added in 1986 (2nd). The table below gives an overview of all host cities and countries of the Asia Junior Championships.

Championships
Juniors : U19 / Cadets: U15

Medal table

 As of 2022:

See also
 ITTF World Youth Championships
 Asian Table Tennis Championships
 South East Asian Junior and Cadet Table Tennis Championships
 Asian Cup
 List of table tennis players

References

External links
Events-Asian Junior and Cadet Championships
Asian Junior Championships Results (PDF)
ITTF Statistics
ITTF Museum

 
table tennis
Table tennis competitions
Recurring sporting events established in 1983
Annual sporting events